The Land of Hope is a lost 1921 American drama film directed by Edward H. Griffith and written by Fred Myton. The film stars Alice Brady, Jason Robards Sr., Ben Hendricks Jr., Schuyler Ladd, Larry Wheat, and Martha McGraw. The film was released in July 1921, by Realart Pictures Corporation.

Cast   
Alice Brady as Marya Nisko
Jason Robards Sr. as Sascha Rabinoff 
Ben Hendricks Jr. as Jan
Schuyler Ladd as Serge Kosmanski
Larry Wheat as Stephen Ross 
Martha McGraw as Sophia
Betty Carsdale as Mildred St. John
Fuller Mellish as Josef Marinoff
Bernard Siegel

References

External links

1921 films
1920s English-language films
Silent American drama films
1921 drama films
Films directed by Edward H. Griffith
Lost American films
American silent feature films
American black-and-white films
1921 lost films
Lost drama films
1920s American films